The 1956 Rhode Island Rams football team was an American football team that represented the University of Rhode Island as a member of the Yankee Conference during the 1956 NCAA College Division football season. In its first season under head coach Herb Maack, the team compiled a 2–6 record (1–4 against conference opponents), finished in sixth/last place out of six teams in the Yankee Conference, and was outscored by a total of 235 to 87. The team played its home games at Meade Stadium in Kingston, Rhode Island.

Schedule

References

Rhode Island
Rhode Island Rams football seasons
Rhode Island Rams football